Yenatha may refer the following places in Myanmar:

 Yenatha, Kale, village in Kale Township, Kale District, in the Sagaing Region
 Yenatha, Madaya, village in Madaya Township, Pyin Oo Lwin District, in the Mandalay Region